The 2006 Esiliiga is the 16th season of the Esiliiga, second-highest Estonian league for association football clubs, since its establishment in 1992.

FC Kuressaare gained automatic promotion to the Meistriliiga as FC Levadia II are the reserve team for Meistriliiga champions FC Levadia and therefore can not be promoted to the same league as its parent club. JK Tallinna Kalev also go up after winning the promotion-relegation play-off.
The league's top-scorer was FC Levadia youngster Kaimar Saag with 37 goals. Nõmme Kalju's Andrus Mitt scored 35 goals.

Final table of Esiliiga season 2006

Promotion/relegation playoff

Season statistics

Top goalscorers
As of 11 November 2007.

See also
 2006 Meistriliiga

References

Esiliiga seasons
2
Estonia
Estonia